Aletrimyti is an extinct genus of recumbirostran lepospondyl from the Early Permian of Oklahoma.

De type species Aletrimyti gaskillae was named in 2015 by Matt Szostakiwskyj, Jason D. Pardo and Jason S. Anderson.

References

Cisuralian amphibians of North America
Fossil taxa described in 2015
Recumbirostrans
Paleontology in Oklahoma